Bebnine is a town located in the Akkar District of the Akkar Governorate in Lebanon. Its inhabitants are primarily Sunni Muslims.

History
In 1838, Eli Smith noted  the village,  whose inhabitants were Sunni Muslims and Greek Orthodox, located west of esh-Sheikh Mohammed.

In 1856 it was named Bibnin on Kiepert's map of Palestine/Lebanon published that year.

References

Bibliography

 

Populated places in Akkar District
Sunni Muslim communities in Lebanon